Fort Oglethorpe may refer to:

Fort Oglethorpe, Georgia, a town
Fort Oglethorpe (Fort Oglethorpe, Georgia), Army base founded in 1904
Fort Oglethorpe (prisoner-of-war camp), a  World War I military facility near the town of Fort Oglethorpe
Fort James Jackson, fort built during 1808–1812 that protected Savannah, Georgia and was also known as Fort Oglethorpe